The following lists events in 1911 in Iceland.

Incumbents
 Monarch: Frederick VIII
Prime Minister – Björn Jónsson (until 14 March); Kristján Jónsson (from 14 March)

Events
 The University of Iceland is established.
11 May – Valur is founded.

Births
14 January – Björn Hjörtur Guðmundsson, craftsman, master carpenter, idealist and environmental pioneer (d. 1998)
18 February – Auður Auðuns, lawyer and politician (d. 1999).
30 June – Sigurbjörn Einarsson, clergyman and doctor of theology, Bishop of Iceland (d. 2008)

Full date missing
 Hulda Jakobsdóttir, politician (d. 1998).

Deaths
 Sigfús Eymundsson, photographer and bookseller (b. 1837)

References

 
Iceland
Iceland
Years of the 20th century in Iceland